Sarat Barkotoky (born 1 March 1935) is an Indian politician from the state of Assam. He is a former Member of Assam Legislative Assembly for Sonari and Education minister. He was also a Minister of State in the Hiteswar Saikia cabinet.

Early life and education 
Barkotoky was born on 1 March 1935 to the late Hem Chandra Barkotoky and the late Chandra Probha Barkotoky in Mathurapur, Sonari. He has a B.T. Examination in the year 1970 from Dibrugarh University. He also has a B.A.

Political career 
Barkotoky was the Indian National Congress candidate for the constituency of Sonari in the 1991 Assam Legislative Assembly election. His predecessor, Bhadreswar Buragohain, did not seek reelection and became a Rajya Sabha MP. Barkotoky received 38877 votes, 57.96% of the total vote and became the new MLA for Sonari. He defeated his nearest opponent by 23491 votes. He was the made a minister of state  in the Hiteswar Saikia cabinet. After Saikia died, he retained his role as minister of state in the short Barman ministry.

Barkotoky sought reelection in the 1996 Assam Legislative Assembly election. He received 52052 votes, 61.8% of the total vote and defeated his nearest opponent by 31464 votes.

He again sought reelection in the 2001 Assam Legislative Assembly election. He received 59554 votes, 67.25%. He defeated his nearest opponent by 34941 votes. He was made minister for the Public Works Department in the 2001 Tarun Gogoi cabinet. As PWD minister, Barkotoky implemented a Mega project for development of road and drainage of Assam, spending 50 crore.

In the 2006 Assam Legislative Assembly election, Barkotoky sought reelection. He received 56206 votes, defeating his nearest opponent by 34990 votes. When Tarun Gogoi constituted his new ministry, Barkotoky was not included.

In the 2011 Assam Legislative Assembly election, he sought reelection in Sonari. He received 56655 votes, 53.38% of the total vote. He defeated his nearest opponent by 28904 votes. After a cabinet reshuffle in the Tarun Gogoi ministry, on 23 January 2015 Barkotoky was made Education minister in Assam. He spoke with the Chief Minister when he said the education was the priority in Assam. He also requested for Smriti Irani for state grants for universities.

In the 2016 Assam Legislative Assembly election, Barkotoky sought reelection as the Congress candidate for Sonari. He received 49210 votes, 37.47% pf the total vote. He lost to BJP candidate, Topon Kumar Gogoi, by 24117 votes. He was one of 10 cabinet ministers who lost in the election.

Personal life 
Barkotoky married Bina Barkotoky on 5 June 1965 and they had 3 children, two sons and one daughter. He is interested in sports like Table Tennis, Badminton, Carrom etc. He is associated with various political and cultural organisations. He is also Vice Chairman of the State Planning Board since 2006 and Chairman of the Committee on Estimates, ALA since 2010.

References 

Assam MLAs 1991–1996
Assam MLAs 1996–2001
Assam MLAs 2001–2006
Assam MLAs 2006–2011
Assam MLAs 2011–2016
Assam politicians
1935 births
Indian National Congress politicians from Assam
State cabinet ministers of Assam
Living people